Sakura Wars: The Animation is a Japanese anime television series directed by Manabu Ono, written by Ono and Tatsuhiko Urahata, and animated by Sanzigen. Co-produced by Sega, Sammy and Tencent Japan, under the name SAKURA PROJECT, it is based on the setting and story of the 2019 video game Sakura Wars, and takes place after the events of the game. Set in 1941, the series follows the adventures of Seijuro Kamiyama and the Imperial Combat Revue. The series ran on Tokyo MX and BS11 from April 3 to June 19, 2020 and is streamed in North America by Funimation. It is scheduled to be released in four Blu-ray and DVD compilations by Pony Canyon, with the first two being released on June 17, 2020. In Southeast Asia and South Asia, the series is licensed by Medialink and released on Ani-One YouTube channel.

Plot

Sakura Wars the Animation is set in a fictionalized version of 1941 (one year after the events of the video game) during the Taishō era and follows the adventures of the Imperial Combat Revue, a military unit dedicated to fighting supernatural threats against Tokyo while maintaining their cover as a theater troupe. With its captain Seijuro Kamiyama absent, Sakura Amamiya temporarily assumes command. Following an incident in Europe, Kamiyama takes a young Russian girl named Klara M. Ruzhkova and leaves her in the Flower Division's care. However, Moscow Combat Revue captain Valery Kaminski is sent to Tokyo to retrieve Klara and the Flower Division must stop him.

Cast

Episode list

References
Citations

Notes

External links
 
 
 

2020 anime television series debuts
2020 Japanese television series debuts
2020 Japanese television series endings
Anime television series based on video games
Sanzigen
Science fiction anime and manga
Works based on Sakura Wars
Funimation
Medialink
Tokyo MX original programming